Caviar tongue  is a condition characterized by the purplish nodular swelling of veins found on the undersurface of the tongue. 

It is normal for there to be veins visible underneath the tongue, partly because the mucous membrane is so thin and translucent in this region, but where these vessels become dilated and tortuous, they may appear round and black like caviar. However, with caviar tongue, the blood vessels become dilated and tortuous and appear round and black (resembling caviar). Caviar tongue is also referred to as sublingual varices (plural) and varix (singular) and look like varicose veins in the tongue. It is a benign, asymptomatic, venous lesion.

History
It was first described by William Bennett Bean in 1952, when he thought it looked like caviar.

See also

 Varicose veins
 Varices

References 

Conditions of the mucous membranes
Tongue disorders